Hemidactylus pauciporosus is a species of gecko. It is endemic to Somalia. It was originally described as a subspecies of Hemidactylus yerburii, but recognized as a species in 2016.

References

Hemidactylus
Geckos of Africa
Reptiles of Somalia
Endemic fauna of Somalia
Reptiles described in 1894
Taxa named by Benedetto Lanza